For China-Vietnam conflicts, see:

China–Vietnam relations
 Sino-Vietnamese War 20th Century invasion of Vietnam by PRC
List of Chinese wars and battles
List of wars involving Vietnam